State Route 83 (SR 83) is an  state highway that travels southwest to northeast, with a southeast–to–northwest section, within portions of Monroe, Jasper, Morgan, and Walton counties in the central part of the U.S. state of Georgia. It connects Forsyth, Monticello, Madison, and Monroe. The portion from the southwestern city limits of Monticello to the Jasper–Morgan county line is included in the Monticello Crossroads Scenic Byway.

Route description
SR 83 begins at an intersection with US 341/SR 7 (Peach Blossom Trail) northeast of Culloden, in Monroe County. It heads northeast, briefly paralleling the Monroe–Lamar county line, to Forsyth. Once in Forsyth, the route forms a concurrency with US 41/SR 18, heading to downtown. Once in downtown Forsyth, the route intersects US 41/SR 18/SR 42. Here, SR 42/SR 83 begin a brief concurrency to the north. Less than  later, the concurrency ends. SR 83 has an interchange with Interstate 75 (I-75) before leaving Forsyth. Just before leaving Monroe County, the route crosses over the Towaliga River and intersects US 23/SR 87 near Juliette. The route continues to the northeast, crossing over the Ocmulgee River at the Monroe–Jasper county line, and heads toward Monticello. Just prior to entering town, it has an intersection with SR 380 (Perimeter Road), a bypass south and east of the town. SR 83 then makes its way into downtown, where it intersects SR 11/SR 16/SR 212 at the southwestern corner of the town's square. The four routes are concurrent for one block (the southeastern corner of the square), where SR 11's southern lanes depart the concurrency. However, since the square is a one-way road, SR 11's northern lanes continue the concurrency to the northeastern corner of the square. Here, SR 16's and SR 212's eastbound lanes depart the concurrency and SR 83 departs the square and the concurrency. SR 83 then leaves Monticello, passing the Hunter Pope Country Club, and continues to travel to the northeast, toward Madison. On the way, the route has an intersection with SR 142 in Shady Dale. Shortly after, it crosses into Morgan County. Then, it crosses over the Little River. In Madison, it has an interchange with I-20. Then, it begins a concurrency with US 278/SR 12. Just under  later, US 129/US 441/SR 24 join the concurrency on the northeastern corner of Walton Park. The six routes head to the northeast, past Hill Park, before reaching downtown. Once in downtown Madison, SR 83 leaves the concurrency and travels to the northwest, toward Monroe. It passes through the town of Bostwick. It crosses into Walton County and enters Good Hope, where the route has an intersection with the western terminus of SR 186. SR 83 continues in a northwest direction until its northern terminus, an intersection with US 78/SR 10 in the northeastern part of Monroe.

The only portion of SR 83 that is part of the National Highway System, a system of routes determined to be the most important for the nation's economy, mobility, and defense, is the concurrency with US 129/US 441/SR 24 in Madison.

Residents
There is a high unemployment rate amongst residents of the route.

Major intersections

Monticello connector route

State Route 83 Connector (SR 83 Conn.) was a  connector that existed entirely within the central part of Jasper County. It is the original number of SR 380.

It started at an intersection with the SR 83 mainline (Forsyth Street) southwest of Monticello. Immediately, the highway crossed over some railroad tracks of Norfolk Southern Railway and traveled to the southeast. The highway curved to the south-southeast and back to the southeast. It traveled north of Malone Lake before it curved to the east and intersected SR 11 south of the town. Then, SR 83 Conn. traveled to the northeast to an intersection with SR 212 (Milledgeville–Monticello Road) east-southeast of Monticello. Just past this intersection, the connector met its eastern terminus, an intersection with SR 16 east of town.

See also

References

External links

 
 Georgia Roads (Routes 81 - 100)

083
Transportation in Monroe County, Georgia
Transportation in Jasper County, Georgia
Transportation in Morgan County, Georgia
Transportation in Walton County, Georgia